The World Is Not Enough is a 2001 action-adventure game developed by 2n Productions and published by Electronic Arts for the Game Boy Color. The game was the final release of the video games based on the 1999 James Bond film The World Is Not Enough starring Pierce Brosnan, following The World Is Not Enough (Nintendo 64) and The World Is Not Enough (PlayStation).

Gameplay

The World Is Not Enough is an action-adventure game based on the 1999 James Bond film of the same name, where the player must control James Bond from a top-down oblique projection through eight mission-based levels. The game closely follows the plot of the film and its levels take place in film locations such as London and a Russian submarine. In each level, the player must complete a number of objectives and then escape. Objectives range from collecting keycards to gaining access to restricted areas of a level or using high-tech gadgets such as remote mines to destroy objects.

Bond has a limited amount of health which decreases when attacked by enemies, but the player can collect health-recovery items to restore a portion of his health. The player can also use several weapons to neutralize enemies, ranging from pistols to submachine guns, a grenade launcher, and a taser. If Bond dies, the player must start the level again from the beginning. Passwords must be used to restore the game to a specific level.

Development and release
The World Is Not Enough was developed by 2n Productions, a video game developer based in Redwood City, California, and published by Electronic Arts for the Game Boy Color handheld console. The game was released on a 16-megabit cartridge, on September 18, 2001.  The game was initially announced to be compatible with the Transfer Pak accessory, allowing players to transfer multiplayer character data to its Nintendo 64 counterpart depending on how far they reached in the game; however, this feature was seemingly dropped before release.

Reception

The World Is Not Enough received generally mixed reviews from critics, who unfavorably compared it to Metal Gear Solid. AllGame praised the game for its diverse level designs and soundtrack, but noted the game's difficulty. Nintendo of America's official print magazine, Nintendo Power, criticized the game's clumsy controls, noting that the player cannot walk and shoot at the same time, while the French video games magazine, felt that the graphics lacked details. The Spanish official Nintendo magazine, Nintendo Acción, criticized the game's artificial intelligence, stating that enemies stop following the player if they are only a few steps away, and remarked that, due to the game's lack of graphic details, it is occasionally difficult to determine the objects that can be interacted with.

References

External links

2001 video games
Action-adventure games
Biscay in fiction
Game Boy Color games
Game Boy Color-only games
Istanbul in fiction
James Bond video games
Single-player video games
Tactical shooter video games
The World Is Not Enough
Top-down video games
Video games developed in the United States
Video games set in Azerbaijan
Video games set in Kazakhstan
Video games set in London
Video games set in Spain
Video games set in Turkey
Video games with oblique graphics